Eva Maria "Evi" Pracht (née Neckermann; 29 June 1937 – 15 February 2021) was a Canadian equestrian who competed in dressage in the 1984 Summer Olympics and was part of the bronze-medallist team at the 1988 Summer Olympics.

Biography
Born in Würzburg, she was the only daughter of equestrian Josef Neckermann. She had two brothers, Peter and Johannes.

Having initially competed in show jumping, she eventually switched disciplines and learned dressage from her father. By the late 1960s, she was campaigning her father's 1964 Olympic ride Antoinette. The pair placed 3rd at the CHIO Aachen in 1969 and earned a silver medal at the German Championships that same year.

She married entrepreneur Hans Pracht, and in 1981 the couple and two children moved to Cedar Valley, Ontario, Canada. Pracht rode her first Olympics in Los Angeles in 1984 aboard Little Joe, a horse which she later passed on to her daughter Martina. Four years later, at the 1988 Summer Olympics, she climbed the Olympic podium as part of the bronze medal winning Canadian Equestrian Team for dressage, aboard Swedish Warmblood gelding Emirage.

Aside from Antoinette, Little Joe and Emirage, Pracht's celebrated competition horses included Mazepa, Duccas, Cantate and Lyogen.

She represented Canada at the following events: 
 1982 World Championships: Equestrian – Dressage Individual
 1984 Summer Olympics: Los Angeles, Equestrian – Dressage Team and Individual – with equine partner Little Joe
 1986 World Championships: Equestrian – Dressage Individual
 1987 Pan American Games: Equestrian – Dressage Team, Gold Medal – with equine partner Emirage
 1988 Summer Olympics: Seoul, Equestrian – Dressage Team, Bronze Medal – with equine partner Emirage
 1991 World Cup: Equestrian – Dressage Individual

Pracht helped coach numerous quadrilles through the years and organised the choreography. She helped, mentored and was eyes on the ground for Canadian dressage riders such as Gina Smith, Evi Strasser, Ashley Holzer, and many more.

Pracht died from COVID-19 on 15 February 2021, during the COVID-19 pandemic in Canada. She was 83.

Family
Pracht's daughter, Martina, was born in Frankfurt, Hesse, West Germany, in 1964 and also became an accomplished equestrian in Canada. She has won seven medals, five gold and two silver, from the North American Young Rider Championships.

In 1984, Pracht's 23-year old son Josef Johannes "Jo Jo" Pracht died by suicide when he jumped off a bridge on the A45 motorway near Dillenburg. In 1978 Jo Jo had lost his leg in a moped accident after slipping on a rainy road.

References

External links
 

1937 births
2021 deaths
Canadian dressage riders
Canadian female equestrians
Canadian sportswomen
Equestrians at the 1984 Summer Olympics
Equestrians at the 1987 Pan American Games
Equestrians at the 1988 Summer Olympics
German emigrants to Canada
Medalists at the 1987 Pan American Games
Medalists at the 1988 Summer Olympics
Olympic bronze medalists for Canada
Olympic equestrians of Canada
Olympic medalists in equestrian
Pan American Games gold medalists for Canada
Pan American Games medalists in equestrian
Sportspeople from Würzburg
Place of death missing
Deaths from the COVID-19 pandemic in Canada
20th-century Canadian women
21st-century Canadian women